Alessio Martinelli (born 26 April 2001) is an Italian racing cyclist, who currently rides for UCI ProTeam .

Major results
2018
 8th Trofeo Citta di Loano
2019
 1st Mountains classification, Tour du Pays de Vaud
 2nd  Road race, UCI Junior Road World Championships
 2nd Overall Giro della Lunigiana
1st Stage 3
 3rd Road race, National Junior Road Championships
 5th Trofeo Emilio Paganessi
2021
 4th Overall Giro della Regione Friuli Venezia Giulia
1st Young rider classification
 4th Giro del Medio Brenta
2022
 1st Grand Prix Alanya
2023
 4th Trofeo Andratx–Mirador D'es Colomer
 7th Trofeo Serra de Tramuntana

References

External links

2001 births
Living people
Italian male cyclists
People from Sondalo
Cyclists from the Province of Sondrio